Dorcadion demokidovi is a species of beetle in the family Cerambycidae. It was described by Suvorov in 1915. It is known from the Caucasus.

References

demokidovi
Beetles described in 1915